The Universidad de Morón (University of Morón) is a private university located in Morón, Buenos Aires province, Argentina, and was founded in 1960.

Ten faculties offer courses on Agronomy and Agro-alimentary Sciences; Architecture, Design, Art and Urbanism; Law, Political and Social Sciences; Exact, Chemical, and Material Sciences; Philosophy, Education Sciences, and Humanities; Information, Communication Sciences, and Special Techniques; Engineering; Medicine; Applied Tourism Sciences and Population.

The university has been a part of an aggregate internet meme because the name of the university sounds like the English word "moron," which typically describes "a stupid person."

History 

The Universidad de Morón was inaugurated on May 18, 1960. At the time of its inauguration, the university possessed two academic units: the School of Law and Social Sciences and the School of Arts.

References

External links
 Official website

Moron
Universities in Buenos Aires Province
Educational institutions established in 1960
1960 establishments in Argentina